Bucher Glacier is a small glacier draining the west slopes of Rudozem Heights and flowing to Bourgeois Fjord just north of Bottrill Head on the German Peninsula, Fallières Coast on the west side of Graham Land, Antarctica. It was named by the UK Antarctic Place-Names Committee in 1958 for Edwin Bucher, Swiss glaciologist and author of many publications on snow and avalanches.

See also
 List of glaciers in the Antarctic
 Glaciology

Map
 British Antarctic Territory.  Scale 1:200000 topographic map. DOS 610 Series, Sheet W 67 66.  Directorate of Overseas Surveys, Tolworth, UK, 1978.

References

External links
 SCAR Composite Antarctic Gazetteer.

Glaciers of Fallières Coast